Stop the World is the eighth (and to date, most recent) studio album by British pop duo Right Said Fred. It was released in 2011, and was followed by the Night of the Living Fred tour. The album has received widespread negative reviews.

Track listing
"Stop the World"
"Julianne"
"Raining in England"
"Obvious"
"Waiting for a Train"
"I Ain't Your Guy"
"Trouble with Love"
"We're All Criminals"
"Happily Ever After"
"Come Dancing"
"Feels Like Love"
"Two White Boys"

2011 albums
Right Said Fred albums